Sir Mark Hedley, DL (born 23 August 1946) is a British retired judge. He was a Justice of the High Court from 2002 to 2013.

Early life and education
Hedley was born on 23 August 1946 in London, England. He was brought up in Africa. He was educated at Framlingham College, then an all-boys private school. He studied law at the University of Liverpool, graduating with a Bachelor of Laws (LLB) degree.

Legal career
Hedley was called to the bar at Gray's Inn in 1969 and made a bencher in 2002. He was appointed a Recorder in 1988 and a circuit judge for the Northern Circuit in 1992. On 11 January 2002, he was appointed a High Court judge, receiving the customary knighthood, and assigned to the Family Division. He retired on 10 January 2013.

Ecclesiastical career
Since 1975, Hedley has been a Reader (licensed lay minister) of the Church of England. In 2002, he was appointed Chancellor of the Anglican Diocese of Liverpool.

Honours
On 27 April 2015, Hedley was appointed a Deputy Lieutenant (DL) of Merseyside.

He was awarded the Canterbury Cross for Services to the Church of England in 2022.

References

1946 births
Living people
21st-century English judges
Deputy Lieutenants of Merseyside
Family Division judges
Knights Bachelor
People educated at Framlingham College
Anglican lay readers
British Anglicans
20th-century English judges